The 2015 Denver Broncos season was the franchise's 46th season in the National Football League (NFL) and the 56th overall. It was also the fourth season with Peyton Manning as the team's starting quarterback, as well as the final season of Manning's 18-year NFL career.

After losing in the Divisional round of the playoffs during three of the previous four seasons, the Broncos underwent numerous coaching changes, including a mutual parting with head coach John Fox, and the hiring of Gary Kubiak as the new head coach. Under Kubiak and offensive coordinator Rick Dennison, the Broncos planned to install a run-oriented West coast offense with zone blocking to blend in with Manning's shotgun passing style, but struggled with numerous changes and injuries to the offensive line.

Backup quarterback Brock Osweiler filled in for Manning during the second half of the regular season, before Manning re-claimed the starting quarterback position prior to the team's postseason run. Under defensive coordinator Wade Phillips, the Broncos' defense ranked No. 1 in total yards, passing yards, average yards per rush and sacks, and like the previous three seasons, the team continued to set numerous individual, league and franchise records. The team's defense is widely considered to be among the greatest of all time, particularly due to the fact that it was pressured to aid a lackluster offense for most of the season. The team's defensive backfield, arguably the most dominant part of the defense, gave itself the nickname "No Fly Zone".

The Broncos clinched their fifth-consecutive AFC West division title, fourth consecutive first-round bye and the AFC's No. 1 playoff seed for the third time in four seasons. As was the case during the regular season, the Broncos' defense dominated their playoff opponents. During the Broncos' three playoff games, they recorded 14 sacks, forced seven turnovers, surrendered only one touchdown pass and gave up just 44 combined points (an average of just 14.7 points a game). The Broncos defeated the Pittsburgh Steelers 23–16 in the Divisional round and the defending Super Bowl champion New England Patriots 20–18 in the AFC Championship Game. The Broncos then defeated the Carolina Panthers 24–10 in Super Bowl 50 to earn the franchise's third Super Bowl championship, and the first since winning back-to-back Super Bowls in 1997 and 1998.

As of 2023, this represents the most recent playoff appearance and AFC West title for the Broncos.

Coaching changes

Departures
On January 12, 2015, one day after the Broncos' 24–13 loss to the Indianapolis Colts in the Divisional round of the 2014 playoffs, the Broncos and head coach John Fox decided to mutually part ways. Fox compiled a 49–22 record in four seasons (including the playoffs), led the Broncos to four consecutive AFC West division titles, a first-round bye in three consecutive seasons as well as a berth in Super Bowl XLVIII, but lost in the Divisional round of the playoffs in three of his four seasons as head coach. Fox departed with a .719 winning percentage in his four seasons as head coach – the highest in franchise history. Four days later (January 16), Fox was hired as the new head coach of the Chicago Bears.

The following former Broncos' coaching assistants from 2014 were reunited with John Fox in Chicago: Defensive backs coach Sam Garnes, special teams coordinator Jeff Rodgers, defensive line coach Jay Rodgers, offensive coordinator Adam Gase, offensive line coach Dave Magazu, assistant special teams coordinator Derius Swinton II, assistant strength & conditioning coach Jason George and offensive quality control coach Bo Hardegree.

Defensive coordinator Jack Del Rio was hired as the new head coach of the Oakland Raiders, defensive backs coach Cory Undlin was hired to the same position with the Philadelphia Eagles and linebackers coach Richard Smith was hired to a senior defensive position with the Atlanta Falcons.

Additions

On January 18, 2015, the Broncos finalized a deal that made Kubiak the team's new head coach, and he was formally introduced at a press conference at the team's Dove Valley headquarters on January 20. Kubiak served as a backup quarterback to Broncos' executive vice president/general manager John Elway from 1983 to 1991, and also served as the Broncos' offensive coordinator from 1995 to 2005, before serving as the Houston Texans' head coach from 2006 to 2013.

The following eight coaching assistants were reunited with Kubiak:

Other additions

Clancy Barone, who had served as the Broncos' tight ends coach since 2011, was moved to the offensive line coach position that he held in 2010. Joe Woods was hired as the defensive backs coach. Woods served in the same capacity with the Oakland Raiders in 2014. Fred Pagac was hired as the team's outside linebackers coach. He served as the Buffalo Bills' linebackers coach in 2014. Samson Brown was hired as the team's assistant defensive backs coach. Like Pagac, Brown also served on the Bills' staff in 2014.

Front office changes
 February 27: Jerry Butler, who served as the team's director of player development since 2011, was hired to the same position with the Chicago Bears. The Broncos declined to renew his contract following the 2014 season.
 May 14: Anthony Kelly was hired by the Chicago Bears to become their new director of pro personnel. Kelly was promoted to the Broncos' assistant director of pro personnel position in 2010. He would now head that department for the Bears, along with nine coaches who were with the Broncos in 2014.

Roster changes

Free agents

Signings

Departures

Trades
 April 1: The Broncos acquired center/guard Gino Gradkowski in a trade with the Baltimore Ravens that involved 2016 draft-pick considerations. Gradkowski was later released on September 6.
 August 31: Offensive tackle Chris Clark was traded to the Houston Texans in exchange for a 2016 seventh-round selection.
 November 2: The Broncos acquired tight end Vernon Davis in a trade with the San Francisco 49ers that involved 2016 and 2017 draft-pick considerations.

Draft

Draft trades

Undrafted free agents
All undrafted free agents were signed after the 2015 NFL draft concluded on May 2, unless noted otherwise. For the first time since 2003, the Broncos did not have at least one rookie free agent that made the Week 1 regular season roster.

Suspensions
 July 24: Defensive end Derek Wolfe was suspended for the first four games of the season for violating the league's policy on performance-enhancing substances.
 September 3: Safety T. J. Ward was suspended for the team's regular season opener vs. the Baltimore Ravens for violating the league's personal conduct policy. The suspension was the result of a May 2014 incident in which Ward threw a mug at a female bartender inside a Denver strip club.
 November 9: Cornerback Aqib Talib was suspended for one game for an eye-gouging incident with Indianapolis Colts' tight end Dwayne Allen, during the Broncos' Week 9 loss to the Colts. Talib unsuccessfully appealed his suspension, and missed the team's Week 10 loss to the Kansas City Chiefs.

Injuries
 May 9: Tight end Jeff Heuerman, the team's third-round draft selection, suffered a ruptured ACL in his left knee during rookie minicamp. Though he signed his rookie contract on June 4, he was placed on the season-ending injured reserve on August 31.
 May 27: Offensive tackle Ryan Clady suffered a ruptured ACL in his left knee, during the Broncos' organized team activities (OTAs), and was placed on injured reserve two days later (May 29).
 August 1: Wide receiver Kyle Williams suffered a ruptured Achilles tendon during the second day of training camp, and was placed on injured reserve two days later (August 3).
 August 20: Defensive tackle Marvin Austin was placed on injured reserve due to a groin injury. He was later released from the injured reserve on October 27.
 October 18: Linebacker Shane Ray, the team's first-round draft selection, suffered a sprained MCL in his right knee, during the Broncos' Week 6 win over the Cleveland Browns, and missed the team's next two games.
 November 2: Offensive tackle Ty Sambrailo, the team's second-round draft selection, was placed on injured reserve on November 2, due to a shoulder injury that he sustained during the team's Week 3 win over the Detroit Lions.
 November 16: Wide receiver Emmanuel Sanders suffered a finger injury, as well as an ankle injury during the Broncos' Week 9 loss to the Indianapolis Colts, and missed the Broncos' Week 11 win over the Chicago Bears.
 November 25: Defensive end Kenny Anunike was placed on injured reserve, after undergoing knee surgery during the preseason. He was active for only three games during the season.
 November 29: Safety T. J. Ward suffered an ankle sprain during the Broncos' Week 12 win over the New England Patriots, and missed the team's next two games.
 December 6: Linebacker Danny Trevathan suffered a concussion during the Broncos' Week 13 win over the San Diego Chargers, and missed the Broncos' Week 14 loss to the Oakland Raiders.
Omar Bolden
Safety/return specialist Omar Bolden missed the last four games of the regular season due to a hamstring injury. He returned for the team's Divisional playoff win over the Pittsburgh Steelers on January 17, 2016, only to suffer a torn knee ligament on a non-contact play during the first quarter. Bolden was placed on injured reserve one day later (January 18), and missed the remainder of the Broncos' postseason run.
David Bruton
Safety David Bruton suffered a concussion during the Broncos' Week 13 win over the San Diego Chargers, and missed the Broncos' Week 14 loss to the Oakland Raiders. Bruton returned to action the following week, and initially thought he suffered a bruised fibula, after he collided with teammate T. J. Ward, during the Broncos' Week 15 loss to the Pittsburgh Steelers. However, it was later revealed that Bruton played the remainder of the game with his fibula fractured, and the team placed him on the season-ending injured reserve two days later (December 22).
DeMarcus Ware
Linebacker DeMarcus Ware was twice sidelined with back injuries. Ware initially suffered a back injury during the team's Week 5 win over the Oakland Raiders on October 11, and missed the team's next game at the Cleveland Browns. Ware re-aggravated the same back injury during the Broncos' Week 9 loss to the Indianapolis Colts, and missed the team's next five games.

Absence of Peyton Manning
On November 16, one day after quarterback Peyton Manning had one of the worst games of his career, media reports indicated that Manning had a partial tear of the plantar fascia in his left foot. The Denver Post indicated that Manning initially suffered the injury during the Broncos' Week 9 loss to the Indianapolis Colts during the previous week, though another report indicated that Manning had been dealing with the injury since training camp. Backup quarterback Brock Osweiler replaced Manning in the third quarter of the Broncos' Week 10 loss to the Kansas City Chiefs, and was announced as the starting quarterback, beginning with the Broncos' Week 11 game at the Chicago Bears. Following an ineffective performance by Osweiler during the first half of the team's Week 17 win over the San Diego Chargers, Manning made his return during the third quarter of that same game, and re-claimed the starting quarterback position for the playoffs.

Staff

Final roster

Preseason

Regular season

Schedule

Note: Intra-division opponents are in bold text.

Game summaries

Week 1: vs. Baltimore Ravens

The Broncos kicked off the  season against the Baltimore Ravens, the Broncos' fifth-consecutive Week 1 home opener. Two first-quarter field goals by placekicker Brandon McManus – from 57 and 56 yards out – gave the Broncos the early 6-point advantage. In the second quarter, a 44-yard field goal by placekicker Justin Tucker got the Ravens on the scoreboard. McManus later countered with a 43-yard field goal just before halftime to put the lead back to 6. Three plays into the Broncos' initial possession of the second half, quarterback Peyton Manning was intercepted by Ravens' cornerback Jimmy Smith for a 24-yard touchdown, in what was the Ravens' only touchdown of the game. After forcing a Broncos' punt, the Ravens increased their lead, with a 44-yard field goal by Tucker. The Broncos were forced to punt on their next two third-quarter offensive possessions. With 10 seconds remaining in the third quarter, the Broncos re-claimed the lead, with cornerback Aqib Talib returning an interception off Ravens' quarterback Joe Flacco 51 yards for a touchdown, in what was the Broncos' only touchdown of the game. The Broncos' defense forced the Ravens' to punt on their next possession early in the fourth quarter, and beginning at the 13:51 mark, the Broncos began a 17-play, 81-yard drive that devoured 10:51 off the clock, but had to settle for a 33-yard field goal by McManus to increase to a 19–13 lead. With 2:55 remaining in the game, the Ravens advanced to as far as the Broncos' 16-yard line, hoping for a game-winning touchdown. On the 14th play of the drive, a pass from Flacco to wide receiver Steve Smith, Sr. that was almost a touchdown was deflected by Broncos' cornerback Bradley Roby near the goal line, falling incomplete. On the next play, with 36 seconds remaining, a pass from Flacco intended for tight end Crockett Gilmore was intercepted by safety Darian Stewart in the end zone, sealing the Broncos' fourth consecutive Week 1 victory.

Notes

This marked the first time since September 17, 2006, that the Broncos won a game without scoring an offensive touchdown. Peyton Manning failed to throw a touchdown pass in a season opener for the first time since .

Week 2: at Kansas City Chiefs

Coming off their hard-fought win over the Ravens, the Broncos traveled to Arrowhead Stadium for an AFC West duel with the Kansas City Chiefs on Thursday Night Football. There was no scoring in the first quarter, which included cornerback David Bruton forcing a fumble off Chiefs' running back Jamaal Charles at the Broncos' 6-yard line. The Chiefs grabbed the lead early in the second quarter, with Charles rushing for a 34-yard touchdown, then added to their lead, when cornerback Marcus Peters returned an interception off Broncos' quarterback Peyton Manning 55 yards for a touchdown. The Broncos responded with two touchdown passes by Manning – a 16-yarder to wide receiver Emmanuel Sanders followed by a 1-yard juggling touchdown catch by tight end Virgil Green just before halftime. The latter scoring play came after Chiefs' quarterback Alex Smith was intercepted by cornerback Aqib Talib deep in Chiefs' territory. That was Talib's 2nd pick in as many weeks.

The two teams exchanged field goals in the third quarter – a 35-yarder by Chiefs' placekicker Cairo Santos and a 54-yarder by Broncos' placekicker Brandon McManus. Following an exchange of punts, the Chiefs were attempting to re-claim the lead midway through the fourth quarter, when Smith was intercepted by cornerback Chris Harris, Jr. at the Broncos' 10-yard line with 6:40 remaining. However, the Broncos went three-and-out, and were forced to punt. The Chiefs took a 24–17 lead six plays later, with running back Knile Davis rushing for an 8-yard touchdown with 2:27 left in the game. Manning then engineered a 10-play, 80-yard drive, culminating in a 19-yard touchdown pass to Sanders with 36 seconds left. The game appeared to be headed to overtime, however, on the initial play of the Chiefs' ensuing possession, Broncos' linebacker Brandon Marshall forced a fumble off Charles deep in Chiefs' territory, and cornerback Bradley Roby returned the fumble 21 yards for a touchdown with 27 seconds in the game. The Broncos' defense subdued the Chiefs' last drive.

As of 2023, this is the last time the Broncos have beaten the Chiefs.

Week 3: at Detroit Lions

Coming off their comeback win over the Chiefs, the undefeated Broncos traveled to Ford Field to face the winless Detroit Lions on Sunday Night Football. After a scoreless first quarter, the Broncos grabbed the lead late in the second quarter, with running back Ronnie Hillman rushing for a 1-yard touchdown. With 1:07 remaining before halftime, the Lions countered, with a 1-yard touchdown run by running back Joique Bell. It was initially ruled as a fumble, but after review, it was reversed to a touchdown as a result of Bell breaking the plane of the goal line. However, Broncos' cornerback Aqib Talib blocked the extra point attempt by placekicker Matt Prater, leaving the score at 7–6. In the closing seconds of the first half, the Broncos responded, with quarterback Peyton Manning connecting on a 45-yard touchdown pass to wide receiver Demaryius Thomas on a 4th-and-1.

Following a questionable fumble by Thomas on the Broncos' opening possession of the second half, Lions' quarterback Matthew Stafford threw a 16-yard touchdown pass to running back Ameer Abdullah. However, the Broncos' defense denied a two-point conversion attempt by Bell that would have tied the game. Each team alternated punts through the next five possessions, until Broncos' linebacker Shaquil Barrett forced a fumble off Stafford near midfield. However, the Broncos had to settle for a 48-yard field goal by placekicker Brandon McManus at the 7:55 mark of the fourth quarter. The Lions were attempting to grab their first lead of the game, however, on the eighth play of the drive, Stafford was intercepted by Broncos' safety David Bruton. Five plays later, the Broncos expanded their lead, with Manning throwing an 11-yard touchdown pass to tight end Owen Daniels just before the two-minute warning to put the game out of reach. That was Daniels' first touchdown as a Bronco. Without any timeouts, the Lions advanced to as far as the Broncos' 15-yard line with 34 seconds remaining, but turned the football over on downs.

Week 4: vs. Minnesota Vikings

Coming off their Sunday Night win over the Lions, the Broncos returned home for an interconference game vs. the Minnesota Vikings, the Broncos' only home game within a six-week span. The Broncos jumped out to a 13–0 lead, consisting of a 33-yard field goal by place kicker Brandon McManus, followed in the second quarter by a 72-yard touchdown run by running back Ronnie Hillman and another field goal by McManus – from 47 yards out. The Vikings got on the scoreboard just after the two-minute warning, with a 38-yard field goal by placekicker Blair Walsh. The Broncos were attempting to add to their lead on the Vikings' side of the field, however, quarterback Peyton Manning was intercepted by Vikings' linebacker Anthony Barr, who returned the football to the Broncos' 27-yard line. Two plays later, the Vikings narrowed the Broncos' lead, with quarterback Teddy Bridgewater finding wide receiver Mike Wallace alone in the end zone for a 4-yard touchdown just before halftime.

The Broncos took the opening possession of the second half, and added to their lead, with a 1-yard touchdown pass from Manning to tight end Owen Daniels on a 4th-and-goal. Each team alternated punts on the next four possessions, until Vikings' running back Adrian Peterson went untouched for a 48-yard touchdown on a 4th-and-1, with 10:09 remaining in the fourth quarter. Two plays into the Broncos' next possession, Manning was intercepted by safety Harrison Smith, and nine plays later, the Vikings pulled even at 20–20, with a 33-yard field goal by Walsh. The Broncos took a 23–20 lead two plays after the two-minute warning, with a 39-yard field goal by McManus. The Vikings had one last possession with 1:51 remaining in the game, however, on the sixth play of their final drive, Broncos' safety T. J. Ward forced a fumble off Bridgewater at the Vikings' 42-yard line, and linebacker Von Miller recovered the game-clinching fumble.

Week 5: at Oakland Raiders

Coming off their win over the Vikings, the Broncos traveled to the O.co Coliseum to face their AFC West division rivals, the Oakland Raiders. Broncos' defensive tackle Sylvester Williams blocked a 38-yard field goal attempt by Raiders' placekicker Sebastian Janikowski late in the first quarter. The Broncos then marched down to as far as the Raiders' 8-yard line, but had to settle for a 25-yard field goal by placekicker Brandon McManus early in the second quarter. The Raiders then took a 7–3 lead, with fullback Marcel Reece receiving a 3-yard touchdown pass from quarterback Derek Carr. The Broncos were attempting to take the lead just before halftime, however, quarterback Peyton Manning was intercepted by Raiders' safety Charles Woodson in the end zone.

The Broncos' offense went three-and-out on the initial possession of the second half, and on the Raiders' first play from scrimmage, Broncos' linebacker Von Miller forced a strip sack and fumble recovery of Carr deep in Raiders' territory. The Broncos had to settle for a 20-yard field goal by McManus to pull to within 7–6. Following a Raiders' three-and-out, the Broncos re-claimed the lead, with a 52-yard field goal by McManus. Following another Woodson interception of Manning, the Raiders were attempting to take the lead on the first play of the fourth quarter, however, Janikowski missed wide-left on a 40-yard field goal attempt. Trailing 9–7, the Raiders were once again attempting to take lead, until Broncos' cornerback Chris Harris, Jr. stepped in front of an errant Carr pass and returned an interception 74 yards for a touchdown. With 6:14 remaining in the game, the Raiders were in punt formation with a 4th-and-6 at their own 24-yard line. However, a 5-yard neutral zone penalty on Broncos' safety Omar Bolden gave the Raiders a 4th-and-1, and after a successful fourth-down conversion, the Raiders kept the drive alive.

With 2:38 remaining in the game, the Broncos' defense denied a 4th-and-long pass completion from Carr to Reece near midfield. However, the Broncos were unable to earn a game-clinching first down just before the two-minute warning, which forced the Raiders to burn two of their three team timeouts. On the very next play, a defensive pass interference penalty on Broncos' cornerback Bradley Roby while defending a pass from Carr to wide receiver Amari Cooper moved the football to the Broncos' 32-yard line. With only one timeout remaining, the Raiders decided to send Janikowski onto the field for a 50-yard field goal to pull the Raiders to within 16–10 with 1:45 remaining in the game. The Raiders' onside kick attempt was unsuccessful, and were forced to use their last timeout on the Broncos' first play from scrimmage. Running back C. J. Anderson gained only two yards on three running plays. With eight seconds remaining, Cooper received a punt near the goal line, but the Broncos' defensive special teams subdued the Raiders' last desperation play of the game.

Notes

The Broncos earned their eighth consecutive win over the Raiders, the Broncos' longest winning streak over the Raiders in franchise history, a streak that the Raiders would snap later in the season, during the teams' Week 14 rematch in Denver.

Week 6: at Cleveland Browns

Coming off five hard-fought victories, the Broncos traveled to FirstEnergy Stadium to face the Cleveland Browns – the Broncos' first visit to Cleveland since 2008. A 29-yard field goal by placekicker Brandon McManus late in the first quarter gave the Broncos an early lead. The Broncos increased their lead to 10–0 early in the second quarter, when cornerback Aqib Talib returned an interception off Browns' quarterback Josh McCown 63 yards for a touchdown. Each team alternated punts for the next five offensive possessions, and the Broncos were attempting to add to their lead just before halftime. However, McManus missed wide-left on a 51-yard field goal attempt.

An 11-yard touchdown pass from McCown to tight end Gary Barnidge got the Browns on the scoreboard on the initial possession of the second half. Later in the third quarter, Broncos' linebacker Shaquil Barrett forced a sack and fumble recovery off McCown on the Browns' side of the field, however, the Broncos had to settle on a 25-yard field goal by McManus. Another field goal by McManus – a 39-yarder early in the fourth quarter, increased the Broncos' lead to 16–7. The Browns responded, with another touchdown pass from McCown to Barnidge – from 14 yards out. On the third play of the Broncos' next drive, a short pass from quarterback Peyton Manning intended for running back Ronnie Hillman was bobbled by Hillman and Browns' linebacker Karlos Dansby intercepted the pass and scampered down the sideline 35 yards for a touchdown. The Broncos' defense denied a two-point conversion pass from McCown to wide receiver Travis Benjamin – even after an offsides penalty on Talib that moved the conversion attempt to the 1-yard line, leaving the Browns with a 20–16 lead.

On the very first play of the Broncos' next drive, Manning threw a 75-yard touchdown pass to wide receiver Emmanuel Sanders to give the Broncos a 23–20 lead with 8:02 remaining in the game. Both teams were forced to punt on their next offensive possessions. With 4:51 remaining, the Browns took possession at their own 40-yard line and were hoping for a go-ahead touchdown after forcing the Broncos to use all three of their team timeouts, but were forced to settle on a game-tying 26-yard field goal by placekicker Travis Coons with 1:41 remaining in the fourth quarter. The Broncos then went three-and-out, and punted the football back to the Browns to their own 40-yard line. The Browns reached the Broncos' 46-yard line in two plays. On the third play, McCown was intercepted by Broncos' safety David Bruton at the Broncos' 30-yard line, giving the Broncos one last possession before the end of regulation. However, they were only able to advance 13 yards, sending the game to overtime.

The Broncos' won the overtime coin toss, but on the fourth play of the initial possession, Manning threw his third interception of the game – this one to Browns' linebacker Barkevious Mingo, who advanced to the Broncos' 39 yards, giving the Browns a chance of a winning field goal. However, the Broncos' defense pushed the Browns' offense back 13 yards in three plays and out of field goal range. After return specialist Jordan Norwood nearly muffed a punt at the Broncos' 12-yard line at the 11:38 mark of overtime, the Broncos assembled a 13-play, 72-yard drive, and with 4:56 left, McManus kicked the game-winning 34-yard field goal.

Notes

The Broncos won their 11th consecutive game against the Browns, dating back to the 1991 season – a streak in which the Browns snapped during the 2018 season. The Broncos improved their all-time series record against the Browns to 23–5 (including the playoffs).

Week 8: vs. Green Bay Packers

Coming off their bye week, the Broncos played host to the Green Bay Packers on Sunday Night Football, with both teams entering the game with 6–0 records. The Broncos jumped out to a 17–0 lead, consisting of a pair of touchdown runs by running back Ronnie Hillman – a 1-yarder in the first quarter and a 15-yarder in the second quarter, followed by a 50-yard field goal by placekicker Brandon McManus. The Packers got on the scoreboard late in the second quarter, with running back Eddie Lacy rushing for a 2-yard touchdown. The Packers narrowed the Broncos' lead to 17–10 on the initial possession of the second half, with a 56-yard field goal by placekicker Mason Crosby. The Broncos' defense then held the Packers scoreless for the remainder of the game, and their offense added to their lead, with running back C. J. Anderson rushing for a 28-yard touchdown, followed in the fourth quarter by a 24-yard field goal by McManus. Later, linebacker DeMarcus Ware forced a sack and fumble off Packers' quarterback Aaron Rodgers, resulting in a safety that put the game out of reach.

Notes

Owner Pat Bowlen was inducted into the Broncos' Ring of Fame during halftime. Due to his battle with Alzheimer's disease, Bowlen relinquished control of the team to team president Joe Ellis and executive vice president/general manager John Elway prior to the start of the 2014 season. The Broncos' defense limited Aaron Rodgers to just 77 yards passing – the lowest of Rodgers' career in a game where he wasn't knocked out by injury. The Broncos started 7–0 for only the second time in franchise history, the other time was in 1998, when they started 13–0 and won Super Bowl XXXIII. This was the first of two games in which the Broncos wore their alternate navy blue jerseys – the other game was Week 14 vs. the Oakland Raiders.

Week 9: at Indianapolis Colts

Coming off their dominating win over the previously unbeaten Packers, the Broncos traveled to Lucas Oil Stadium to face the Indianapolis Colts. A 7-yard touchdown run by running back Frank Gore in the first quarter, followed in the second quarter by a 43-yard field goal by placekicker Adam Vinatieri and a 3-yard touchdown pass from quarterback Andrew Luck to tight end Jack Doyle gave the Colts a 17–0 lead. The latter scoring play occurred after Broncos' quarterback Peyton Manning was intercepted by Colts' safety Mike Adams. The Broncos got on the scoreboard in the closing seconds of the first half, with return specialist Omar Bolden returning a punt 83 yards for a touchdown. The Broncos narrowed the gap on their initial possession of the second half, with Manning throwing a 64-yard touchdown pass to wide receiver Emmanuel Sanders, then tied the game, with a 29-yard field goal by placekicker Brandon McManus. The Colts re-claimed the lead early in the fourth quarter, with an 8-yard touchdown pass from Luck to running back Ahmad Bradshaw. The Broncos responded, with a 1-yard touchdown pass from Manning to tight end Owen Daniels, in what was the final regular-season touchdown pass of Manning's career. Another field goal by Vinatieri – from 55 yards out, gave the Colts a 27–24 lead with 6:18 remaining in the game. On the Broncos' first play of their next possession, Manning was intercepted by Colts' cornerback Darius Butler. The Colts' offense forced the Broncos to use all of their timeouts, and with 28 seconds remaining, Vinatieri kicked a 23-yard field goal. However, the Colts decided not to take the points due to a defensive holding penalty on Broncos' linebacker Danny Trevathan, which enabled Luck to end the game on a quarterback kneel.

Week 10: vs. Kansas City Chiefs

Hoping to rebound from their first loss of the season, the Broncos returned home for an AFC West divisional rematch with the Kansas City Chiefs. After Peyton Manning became the NFL's all-time leader in regular season passing yardage, the game turned sour for the Broncos. Following a Manning interception, the Chiefs capitalized, with a 4-yard touchdown run by running back Charcandrick West. The Broncos' offense went three-and-out on their next two possessions, and the Chiefs increased their lead to 10–0, with a 48-yard field goal by placekicker Cairo Santos. The Chiefs increased their lead to 19–0 at halftime, with three more field goals by Santos – from 49, 34 and 33 yards out. By halftime, Manning had thrown three interceptions and the Broncos' offense had earned only one first down. The Broncos went three-and-out on their first possession of the second half, and a 50-yarder field goal by Santos increased the Chiefs' lead to 22–0. After Manning threw his fourth interception of the game on the Broncos' next possession, he was pulled and replaced by backup quarterback Brock Osweiler for the remainder of the game. Osweiler drove the Broncos' into the red zone early in the fourth quarter, but was intercepted by Chiefs' safety Eric Berry. Two plays later, the Chiefs increased their lead to 29–0, when quarterback Alex Smith connected with West on an 80-yard touchdown pass. The Broncos' finally got on the scoreboard with 5:31 remaining in the game, with running back Ronnie Hillman rushing for a 1-yard touchdown (two-point conversion attempt unsuccessful), followed by a 7-yard touchdown pass from Osweiler to wide receiver Andre Caldwell, but the Chiefs' lead was too much for the Broncos to overcome. Peyton Manning finished the day with the first 0.0 passer rating of his career.

Week 11: at Chicago Bears

Hoping to rebound from back-to-back losses, the Broncos traveled to Soldier Field to face the Chicago Bears. It was the first start for quarterback Brock Osweiler, substituting for the injured Peyton Manning. The Broncos grabbed the lead on their initial possession, when Osweiler, playing on his 25th birthday, connected with wide receiver Demaryius Thomas on a 48-yard touchdown pass. The Bears got on the scoreboard in the second quarter, with two field goals by placekicker Robbie Gould – from 46 and 37 yards out. The Broncos increased their lead to 10–6, with a 24-yard field goal by placekicker Brandon McManus as time expired in the second half. Midway through the third quarter, Broncos' linebacker Danny Trevathan intercepted a pass by Bears' quarterback Jay Cutler deep in Bears' territory. Six plays later, the Broncos were attempting to add to their lead on a 4th-and-goal, however, the Bears' defense prevailed after running back Ronnie Hillman was inadvertently tripped by Owseiler on the hand off at the 2-yard line. The Bears then marched down the field, and another 37-yard field goal by Gould narrowed the Broncos' lead to 10–9 near the end of the third quarter.

The Broncos then increased their lead to 17–9 early in the fourth quarter, when Osweiler fired a 10-yard touchdown pass to wide receiver Cody Latimer, who was playing in place of the injured Emmanuel Sanders. The Bears once again marched down the field, and were facing a 4th-and-goal from the Broncos' 4-yard line, however, a pass from Cutler to running back Jeremy Langford was broken up by Broncos' cornerback Aqib Talib with ten minutes remaining in the game. The Broncos' offense chewed up six minutes of the clock, but were forced to punt, giving the football back to the Bears with 4:23 remaining. On the sixth play of the Bears' next drive, Broncos' linebacker Von Miller forced a strip sack and fumble off Cutler at the Broncos' 35-yard line, which was recovered by defensive end Malik Jackson with 2:30 remaining. However, the Broncos' offense went three-and-out, though they forced the Bears to burn two of their three team timeouts. Just after the two-minute warning, the Bears marched down the field, and finally got into the end zone with only 29 seconds remaining, with Langford lunging for a 2-yard touchdown run. However, the Broncos' defense denied a two-point conversion running attempt by Langford, which would have tied the game. The Bears' subsequent onside kick was unsuccessful, and the Broncos' offense ran out the clock.

Notes

This was the first game this season in which the Broncos' offense did not commit any turnovers. This was Bears' head coach John Fox's first game against the Broncos since mutually parting ways with the Broncos following the end of the 2014 season. It also marked Jay Cutler's first game against the Broncos, who drafted Cutler in the first round of the 2006 draft before he was traded to the Bears prior to the  season. Cutler did not play when the Broncos and Bears last faced each in other in 2011 due to a thumb injury.

Week 12: vs. New England Patriots

Coming off their win over the Bears, the Broncos returned home for an AFC duel with the New England Patriots on NBC's Sunday Night Football, on a snowy night in Denver. The Patriots, who entered the game with a 10–0 record, jumped out to a 14–0 lead, with quarterback Tom Brady tossing two touchdown passes – a 23-yarder to tight end Rob Gronkowski, followed in the second quarter by a 10-yarder to tight end Scott Chandler. The latter score occurred after Broncos' quarterback Brock Osweiler had a pass deflected and intercepted deep in Broncos' territory. The Broncos got on the scoreboard just before the two-minute warning, with running back Ronnie Hillman rushing for a 19-yard touchdown.

The Broncos had a chance to cut into the Patriots' lead on their first possession of the second half, however, placekicker Brandon McManus missed wide-right on a 47-yard field goal attempt. Each team proceeded to trade punts on their next two offensive possessions, until Brady connected with wide receiver Brandon Bolden on a 63-yard touchdown pass at the beginning of the fourth quarter to give the Patriots a 21–7 lead. The Broncos' offense went three-and-out, and were forced to punt. However, Patriots' return specialist Chris Harper muffed the punt, which was recovered by Shaquil Barrett at the Patriots' 36-yard line, giving the Broncos new life. Four plays later, the Broncos pulled to within a one-touchdown deficit, with a 15-yard touchdown run by running back C. J. Anderson. The Broncos' defense forced a punt on the Patriots' next possession, which was aided by an offensive holding penalty on guard Tre' Jackson that nullified a 51-yard pass completion from Brady to wide receiver Keshawn Martin on a third-and-long play. The Broncos then marched down the field, but had to settle for a 21-yard field goal by McManus to pull to within 21–17 with 6:12 remaining in the fourth quarter. The two teams traded punts on their next possessions, and with 2:39 remaining and no timeouts, the Broncos forced a Patriots' punt. The Broncos marched down the field and were facing a 2nd-and-goal from the Patriots' 7-yard line, when Osweiler was sacked for an eight-yard loss. However, the sack was nullified by a defensive holding penalty on Patriots' safety Patrick Chung. On the very next play, the Broncos grabbed their first lead of the game, when Osweiler connected with wide receiver Andre Caldwell on a 4-yard touchdown with 1:15 remaining in the fourth quarter.

The Patriots were not done yet, as Brady engineered a 5-play, 51-yard drive, which culminated with placekicker Stephen Gostkowski kicking a game-tying 47-yard field goal as time expired, sending the game to overtime. The Patriots won the overtime coin toss, but their offense went three-and-out. Following a Patriots' punt, the Broncos started their first overtime drive at their own 43-yard line, and three plays later, Anderson scampered down the sideline for a game-winning 48-yard touchdown run.

Week 13: at San Diego Chargers

Coming off their overtime win over the Patriots, the Broncos traveled to Qualcomm Stadium for their first of two matches with their AFC West division rivals, the San Diego Chargers. On the Broncos' opening drive, quarterback Brock Osweiler connected with wide receiver Demaryius Thomas on a 3-yard touchdown pass. The Chargers had a chance to get on the scoreboard midway through the first quarter, but placekicker Josh Lambo missed wide-right on a 48-yard field goal attempt. Toward the end of the first quarter, the Broncos added to the lead, when linebacker Danny Trevathan intercepted an errant pass by Chargers' quarterback Philip Rivers and returned it for a 25-yard touchdown. After forcing a Chargers' punt early in the second quarter, the Broncos marched down the field with a long drive that chewed up seven minutes, but had to settle for a 23-yard field goal by placekicker Brandon McManus that increased their lead to 17–0. The Chargers got on the scoreboard just after the two-minute warning, with a 51-yard field goal by Lambo, which would be the final scoring play of the game by either team. In the third quarter, the Broncos' defense recovered two forced fumbles, while on offense, McManus missed wide right on a 52-yard field goal attempt and Osweiler threw an interception deep in Chargers' territory. In the fourth quarter, the Broncos' offense punted on all of their possessions (save the final kneel down), while their defense did not allow the Chargers' offense to advance past their own 47-yard line.

Notes

The Broncos swept their division rivals on the road for the sixth time in seven seasons.

Week 14: vs. Oakland Raiders

Coming off their win over the Chargers, the Broncos returned home for an AFC West rematch against the Oakland Raiders. In the first half, the Broncos' defense held the Raiders' offense to –12 net yards of offense, and the Broncos' offense dominated the time of possession by a nearly 3–1 margin, but had to settle for four field goals by placekicker Brandon McManus – from 41 and 35 yards in the first quarter, and 29 and 20 yards in the second quarter. The latter field goal occurred after wide receiver Demaryius Thomas dropped a crucial pass in the end zone from quarterback Brock Osweiler with only four seconds before halftime.

The Raiders got on the scoreboard on the initial possession of the second half, with quarterback Derek Carr connecting with wide receiver Seth Roberts on an 11-yard touchdown pass. Later in the third quarter, the Broncos were backed up to their own 2-yard line following a Raiders' punt, and three plays later, the Raiders pulled to within 12–9, when defensive end Khalil Mack forced a fumble off Osweiler in the end zone for a safety. The Broncos' forced another Raiders' punt, however, at the beginning of the fourth quarter, Emmanuel Sanders muffed a punt deep in Broncos' territory, and the Raiders capitalized three plays later, with Carr throwing a 16-yard touchdown pass to tight end Mychal Rivera (with an unsuccessful two-point conversion attempt). The Broncos drove down the field on their next offensive possession, but McManus missed on a 49-yard field goal attempt that hit the left upright. After each team traded punts, the Raiders were attempting to add to their lead, but placekicker Sebastian Janikowski missed wide left on a 43-yard field goal attempt with 5:27 remaining in the game. The Broncos were facing a 4th-and-5 at their own 38-yard line with 3:50 remaining in the game, but tight end Vernon Davis dropped a pass from Osweiler that would have been a first down. The Broncos' defense forced the Raiders to go three-and-out, while being forced to use two of their remaining three team timeouts. With 2:35 remaining, the Broncos had one last possession, but on the sixth play, another dropped 4th-down pass – this one by Thomas – sealed the Raiders' win.

Notes

The Broncos wore their alternate navy blue jerseys for this game.

Week 15: at Pittsburgh Steelers

Hoping to rebound from their loss to the Raiders, the Broncos traveled to Heinz Field to face the Pittsburgh Steelers. On the Broncos' first offensive possession, running back Ronnie Hillman committed a fumble deep in their own territory, and the Steelers capitalized two plays later, with a 2-yard touchdown run by running back DeAngelo Williams. The Broncos reeled off 20 unanswered points, with quarterback Brock Osweiler throwing a pair of touchdown passes – an 18-yarder to wide receiver Demaryius Thomas and a 61-yarder to wide receiver Emmanuel Sanders, followed in the second quarter by Osweiler scrambling for a 7-yard touchdown. The latter score came after the Broncos' defense intercepted Steelers' quarterback Ben Roethlisberger, and also had a missed extra-point attempt by placekicker Brandon McManus. The Steelers then marched down the field, but had to settle for a 24-yard field goal by placekicker Chris Boswell. The Broncos then increased their lead to 27–10, with Osweiler connecting with Thomas on a 6-yard touchdown pass at the 2-minute warning. However, it would be the Broncos' final scoring play of the game, as the offense was shut out in the second half for the third consecutive week. The Steelers pulled to within 27–13, with Boswell kicking a 41-yard field goal just before halftime.

Midway through the third quarter, Roethlisberger connected with wide receiver Antonio Brown on a 9-yard touchdown. Later in the third quarter, Broncos' return specialist Jordan Norwood returned a punt 71 yards for a touchdown; however, the touchdown was nullified by an illegal substitution penalty. Following a Broncos' three-and-out, the Steelers tied the game early in the fourth quarter, with Roethlisberger throwing a 9-yard touchdown pass to wide receiver Markus Wheaton. Each team proceeded to trade punt on their next two possessions, and with just over five minutes remaining, Osweiler was intercepted by Steelers' linebacker Ryan Shazier at the Broncos' 37-yard line, and three plays later, the Steelers re-claimed the lead, with a 23-yard touchdown pass from Roethlisberger to Brown. The Broncos then marched down to the Steelers' 36-yard line with 2:17 remaining, but turned the football over on downs. Just before the two-minute warning, the Steelers were attempting to run out the clock, however, Roethlisberger chose to pass the football, and was intercepted by linebacker Brandon Marshall just before the two-minute warning, giving the Broncos one last possession. However, Osweiler threw four straight incompletions, and the Steelers ran out the clock.

Week 16: vs. Cincinnati Bengals

Hoping to avoid their first three-game losing streak since 2011, the Broncos played host to the Cincinnati Bengals on Monday Night Football. The Bengals dominated the first half time of possession by more than a 2–1 margin. The Bengals took the opening possession of the game and marched down the field, with quarterback A. J. McCarron, playing in place of the injured Andy Dalton, throwing a 5-yard touchdown pass to wide receiver A. J. Green in the corner of the end zone. The Bengals later added to their lead in the second quarter, with wide receiver Mohamed Sanu rushing for a 6-yard touchdown, in a "wildcat" formation. The Bengals were threatening to add to their lead just before the two-minute warning, but placekicker Mike Nugent missed wide right on a 45-yard field goal attempt. The Broncos then marched down the field, but had to settle for a 23-yard field goal by placekicker Brandon McManus just before halftime.

The Broncos took the initial possession of the second half, and pulled to within 14–10, with quarterback Brock Osweiler connecting with wide receiver Emmanuel Sanders on an 8-yard touchdown pass, which was the only scoring play of the third quarter. After having trouble stopping the Bengals' offense in the first half, the Broncos' defense forced the Bengals to punt on their first four possessions of the second half. The Broncos grabbed a 17–14 lead early in the fourth quarter, with running back C. J. Anderson scampering down the sideline for a 39-yard touchdown. A 52-yard field goal by Nugent helped the Bengals tie the game at 17–17 with 6:51 remaining in the fourth quarter. The Broncos had reached the Bengals' 27-yard line on the next possession, and were attempting a game-winning drive, but Bengals' defensive end Michael Johnson forced a fumble off Anderson, which was recovered by safety Reggie Nelson. However, the Broncos' defense forced a Bengals' punt, and the Broncos' offense began their next drive at their own 20-yard line with 1:40 remaining. However, McManus badly missed wide left on a potential game-winning 45-yard field goal attempt as time expired, sending the game to overtime.

The Broncos won the overtime coin toss, and took a 20–17 lead on their initial possession, with a 37-yard field goal by McManus. The drive was aided by a 15-yard personal foul penalty on Bengals' linebacker Vontaze Burfict for a late hit out-of-bounds. The Bengals started their first offensive possession of overtime at their own 33-yard line, and on their first play, McCarron attempted a pass that was incomplete, as his arm was hit by Broncos' linebacker Von Miller. Broncos' head coach Gary Kubiak called a timeout, thinking the play should have been ruled as a game-ending fumble, however, the initial ruling was upheld by instant replay. On the very next play, McCarron fumbled the snap, which was recovered by Broncos' linebacker DeMarcus Ware to end the game and send the Broncos to the postseason for the fifth consecutive season.

Notes

This was the third game of the season that the Broncos won after trailing 14–0 – the other two were Week 2 at the Kansas City Chiefs and Week 12 vs. the New England Patriots.

Week 17: vs. San Diego Chargers

The Broncos regular-season finale was an AFC West divisional rematch against the San Diego Chargers. On the second play of the game, quarterback Brock Osweiler completed a pass to Demaryius Thomas for a 72-yard touchdown pass. The Chargers scored on their first offensive possession, with a 50-yard field goal by placekicker Josh Lambo. The Broncos' offense turned the football over on four of their next five possessions, including two fumbles and two interceptions. Lambo added a 42-yard field goal later in the second quarter to pull the Chargers to within 7–6. On the Broncos first possession of the second half, C. J. Anderson fumbled the ball for the second consecutive game, leading to quarterback Philip Rivers completing a pass to tight end Antonio Gates for a 13-yard touchdown. On the Broncos' next offensive possession, Peyton Manning took over for Osweiler at quarterback – Manning's first time playing since Week 10 – and the Broncos re-claimed the lead with a 1-yard touchdown run by Anderson. The Broncos then added to their lead early in the fourth quarter, with a 48-yard field goal by placekicker Brandon McManus. However, the Chargers grabbed a 20–17 lead on their next offensive play, with Rivers throwing an 80-yard touchdown pass to wide receiver Tyrell Williams. A 35-yard field goal by McManus tied the game at 20–20 with 9:48 remaining in the game. After the two teams proceeded to traded punts, Rivers was intercepted by Broncos' safety Shiloh Keo, and the Broncos immediately capitalized, with running back Ronnie Hillman rushing for a 23-yard touchdown to give the Broncos a 27–20 lead with 4:50 remaining in the game. The Chargers' offense attempted a rally, and advanced to as far as the Broncos' 40-yard line, but turned the football over on downs just after the two-minute warning. The Broncos ran out the clock.

With the win, coupled with the New England Patriots' loss to the Miami Dolphins earlier in the day, the Broncos clinched the AFC's No. 1 seed – the Broncos, Patriots and Bengals finished tied for the AFC's best record at 12–4, however, the Broncos claimed the No. 1 seed based on head-to-head sweep.

Standings

Division

Conference

Postseason

Schedule

Game summaries

AFC Divisional Playoffs: vs. (6) Pittsburgh Steelers

Following a first-round bye, the Broncos began their run in the 2015–16 NFL playoffs at home by hosting the Pittsburgh Steelers in the Divisional round, in the eighth playoff meeting between the two teams. The Broncos' first drive of the game started at the Steelers' 30-yard line, following a 42-yard punt return by Omar Bolden, but the Broncos were forced to settle on a 28-yard field goal by placekicker Brandon McManus. The Steelers drove to the Broncos' 32-yard line on their next possession and chose to convert a 4th-and-1 instead of attempting a field goal in high winds, but Broncos' cornerback Aqib Talib broke up a long pass from Steelers' quarterback Ben Roethlisberger to wide receiver Markus Wheaton at the goal line. Later in the first quarter, McManus added a 41-yard field goal to give the Broncos a 6–0 lead. The Steelers then drove 80 yards in five plays, and grabbed the lead, with running back Fitzgerald Toussaint rushing for a 1-yard touchdown, then added to their lead early in the second quarter, with a 43-yard field goal by placekicker Chris Boswell. McManus made a 51-yard field goal as time expired in the first half to narrow the Steelers' lead to 10–9. The Broncos' offense converted only one third down out of eight attempts in the first half.

Boswell made a 28-yard field goal on the Steelers' first possession of the second half to extend to a 13–9 lead. After the two teams exchanged punts, McManus kicked his fourth field goal of the game – from 41 yards out. Following an exchange of punts, the Steelers, with a one-point lead, drove 41 yards to the Broncos' 34-yard line in three plays. On the fourth play, Broncos' cornerback Bradley Roby forced a fumble off Toussaint, which was recovered by linebacker DeMarcus Ware with 9:52 remaining in the game. The Broncos then drove 65 yards in 13 plays that consumed 6:48 off the clock, and re-claimed the lead, with running back C. J. Anderson marching for a 1-yard touchdown, coupled with quarterback Peyton Manning throwing a quick pass to wide receiver Demaryius Thomas for a two-point conversion. The Steelers were attempting a rally, but the Broncos' defense tightened, and a Ware sack of Roethlisberger on fourth down just after the two-minute warning gave the Broncos the football at the Steelers' 30-yard line. Three plays later, after forcing the Steelers to burn two of their three remaining timeouts, the Broncos added to their lead, with McManus' fifth field goal of the game – a 45-yarder with 57 seconds remaining. The Steelers then advanced to the Broncos' 29-yard line, following a defensive pass interference penalty on Ward and two passes from Roethlisberger to Bryant totaling 29 yards. With only 19 seconds remaining, a 47-yard field goal by Boswell pulled the Steelers to within 23–16. However, the Steelers' ensuing onside kick attempt was unsuccessful.

With the win, the Broncos advanced to the AFC Championship game.

Notes

The Broncos improved their all-time playoff record against the Steelers to 5–3.

AFC Championship: vs. (2) New England Patriots

Coming off their Divisional playoff win over the Steelers, the Broncos hosted the No. 2 seed New England Patriots in the AFC Championship. The Broncos claimed the lead on their first possession, with quarterback Peyton Manning throwing a 21-yard touchdown pass to tight end Owen Daniels. The Broncos' defense forced the Patriots' offense to punt on their first three possessions. Later in the first quarter, Manning threw a pass that was intended for running back Ronnie Hillman, but after a Patriots' challenge, the play was ruled a backwards pass and fumble, which was recovered by Patriots' linebacker Jonathan Freeny. The Patriots capitalized two plays later, with running back Steven Jackson rushing for a 1-yard touchdown. However, placekicker Stephen Gostkowski missed wide right on the extra-point attempt. Early in the second quarter, Patriots' quarterback Tom Brady was intercepted by Broncos' linebacker Von Miller deep in Patriots' territory. Three plays later, Manning threw another touchdown pass to Daniels – from 12 yards out, in what was the final touchdown pass of Manning's career – regular season or postseason. The Patriots cut into the Broncos' lead midway through the second quarter, with Gostkowski making a 46-yard field goal. The Broncos extended their lead to 17–9 just before halftime, with a 52-yard field goal by placekicker Brandon McManus.

A 38-yard field goal by Gostkowski was the only scoring play of the third quarter. The Broncos' offense went three-and-out on two of their three possessions of the third quarter. To begin the fourth quarter, the Broncos marched to the Patriots' 13-yard line, keyed by a 30-yard run by running back C. J. Anderson, but Manning overthrew wide receiver Jordan Norwood in the end zone on a third-down passing play. The Broncos had to settle on a 31-yard field goal by McManus to extend to a 20–12 lead with 10:06 remaining in the game. The Patriots marched down the field, and were facing a 4th-and-1 at the Broncos' 16-yard line with 6:06 remaining. However, instead of kicking a field goal, Brady threw a short pass to wide receiver Julian Edelman, who was tackled for 1-yard loss by cornerback Chris Harris, Jr. The Broncos were forced to punt on their next possession, and the Patriots once again drove deep into Broncos' territory, facing a 4th-and-6 with 2:25 remaining. However, the Patriots' turned the football over on downs once again, with Brady throwing an incomplete pass in the back of the end zone that was intended for tight end Rob Gronkowski, who was triple-covered by the Broncos' secondary.

The Broncos' offense forced the Patriots to burn two of their three team timeouts prior to two-minute warning, but went three-and-out, giving the football back to the Patriots. The Patriots started their final offensive possession at midfield with 1:52 remaining. After Brady threw three consecutive incompletions, he connected with Gronkowski on a 40-yard pass on a 4th-and-10 play to keep the drive alive. With 17 seconds remaining, the Patriots were facing a 4th-and-goal at the Broncos' 4-yard line, and Brady found Gronkowski in the back of the end zone for a touchdown to narrow the Broncos' lead to 20–18. However, Broncos' cornerback Bradley Roby intercepted Brady on the potential game-tying two-point conversion attempt. The Patriots' ensuing onside kick attempt was unsuccessful, sealing the win for the Broncos.

With the win, the Broncos advanced to their eighth Super Bowl in team history. This was also the final meeting in the rivalry between legendary quarterbacks Peyton Manning and Tom Brady – regular season or postseason. Brady owned an 11–6 record vs. Manning, including the postseason, where Manning held a 3-2 edge (3–1 in AFC title games).

Super Bowl 50: vs. (N1) Carolina Panthers

Placekicker Brandon McManus gave the Broncos the lead on the first possession of the game, with a 34-yard field goal. Following an exchange of punts, Broncos' linebacker Von Miller forced a fumble off Panthers' quarterback Cam Newton, which was recovered by defensive end Malik Jackson in the end zone, giving the Broncos a 10–0 lead. Following another exchange of punts, the Panthers got on the scoreboard early in the second quarter, with running back Jonathan Stewart diving for a 1-yard touchdown. Following miscommunication by the Panthers' defensive special teams, Broncos' return specialist Jordan Norwood returned a punt to the Panthers' 14-yard line. However, the Broncos were forced to settle for a 33-yard field goal by McManus.

The Panthers took the opening possession of the second half, and drove to the Broncos' 26-yard line. However, placekicker Graham Gano missed on a 44-yard field goal attempt that hit the right upright. During the Panthers' drive, Miller broke up a pass from Newton to wide receiver Jerricho Cotchery that would have given the Panthers a first-and-goal. McManus added a 30-yard field goal to extend the Broncos' lead. Early in the fourth quarter, Panthers' defensive end Kony Ealy forced a strip sack and fumble recovery off Broncos' quarterback Peyton Manning near midfield, but were forced to settle on a 39-yard field goal by Gano to narrow the Broncos' lead to 16–10. With 4:51 remaining, Miller then forced yet another strip sack and fumble off Newton, ending the Panthers' drive, with safety T. J. Ward recovering the football at the Panthers' 4-yard line. Following a defensive holding penalty on Panthers' cornerback Josh Norman on a third-and-goal, the Broncos added to their lead, with running back C. J. Anderson rushing for a 2-yard touchdown, coupled with Manning completing a pass to wide receiver Bennie Fowler for a two-point conversion with 3:13 remaining. The Panthers had two more offensive possessions, but the Broncos' defense stood their ground, preventing a first down on both drives to win their third Super Bowl.

Notes

Peyton Manning's two-point conversion pass to Bennie Fowler late in the fourth quarter was the final pass completion of Manning's 18-year NFL career, and this was Manning's final NFL game, as he retired on March 7, 2016.

Statistics

Team leaders

League rankings

Records and milestones
Numerous individual, franchise and league records and milestones were either tied, reached or broken during the season:

Team

 Week 2: With their 31–24 win over the Kansas City Chiefs at Arrowhead Stadium, the Broncos set a new NFL record for consecutive divisional road wins with 13, surpassing the previous record that the San Francisco 49ers held from 1987 to 1990. They would extend their streak to 15 games, with wins over the Oakland Raiders (Week 5) and San Diego Chargers (Week 13).
 Week 6: The Broncos became the second original American Football League (AFL) franchise to reach 450 regular season wins, joining the New England Patriots.
 2015 season: Head coach Gary Kubiak tied a franchise record for wins by a first-year head coach with 12, a feat achieved by Red Miller in 1977.
Super Bowl 50: The Broncos tied an NFL record for sacks in a Super Bowl, with 7.

Peyton Manning

 Week 2: Became the second quarterback in NFL history to achieve 70,000 career passing yards, joining Brett Favre.
 Week 3: Became the second quarterback in NFL history to achieve 6,000 career pass completions, joining Brett Favre.
 Week 4: The Broncos' 23–20 win over the Minnesota Vikings was Peyton Manning's 100th career home win; he became the second quarterback in NFL history to achieve 100 home wins, joining Brett Favre (113).
This would be Peyton Manning's final regular-season win as a starting QB, as he would lose his next two starts against the Colts and Chiefs and would not start another game until the Broncos' Divisional Round matchup against the Steelers due to his plantar fasciitis injury.
 Week 10: At the time, Manning became the NFL's all-time leader in regular season passing yardage, surpassing Brett Favre.
Super Bowl 50: Became the first quarterback in NFL history to lead two different teams to multiple Super Bowl berths and wins. Manning led the Indianapolis Colts to Super Bowls XLI and XLIV – the former of which the Colts won, with Manning winning Most Valuable Player honors; he also led the Broncos to Super Bowl XLVIII (a loss) and won Super Bowl 50. At the time, Manning was the oldest quarterback to lead a team to a Super Bowl berth and victory, as well as the NFL's all-time leader in combined regular season and playoff wins – records that have since been surpassed by Tom Brady.

Other players

Brandon McManus: 
 Divisional playoffs: Set a new franchise record and tied an NFL record for field goals in a playoff game, with five.
Von Miller:
 Week 2: Miller recorded his 50th career sack in his 58th game, becoming the third-fastest player in NFL history behind Derrick Thomas (54 games) and Reggie White (40 games) to achieve that feat.
 2015 season: Became only the third player in Broncos' franchise history to be selected to at least four Pro Bowls within the first five years with the team, joining Steve Atwater and Floyd Little.
 AFC Championship: Set a franchise record with 2.5 sacks in a playoff game.
Jordan Norwood: At the time, Norwood set an NFL record for the longest punt return in Super Bowl history, with a 61-yard return, until Kansas City Chiefs' wide receiver Kadarius Toney surpassed that record with a 65-yard punt return in Super Bowl LVII.
Demaryius Thomas:
 Week 17: Surpassed Rod Smith for the most 100-yard receiving games in franchise history, with 32.
 2015 season: Became only the third wide receiver in NFL history to achieve at least 90 catches, 1,300 yards and five touchdowns in four consecutive seasons, joining Marvin Harrison and Jerry Rice.

Awards and honors

Pro Bowl and All-Pro selections
Four Broncos were selected to the 2016 Pro Bowl: Cornerbacks Chris Harris, Jr. and Aqib Talib, and linebackers Von Miller and DeMarcus Ware. Linebacker Brandon Marshall, wide receiver Demaryius Thomas, guard Louis Vasquez and safety T. J. Ward were named as reserves. However, due to participation in Super Bowl 50, none of them participated in the Pro Bowl. Harris and Miller were also voted to the  All-Pro Team – Miller was named to the First team, while Harris was named to the Second Team.

Other news and notes
 On March 4, quarterback Peyton Manning agreed to a restructured contract that paid him $15 million for the  season. Under the original contract that Manning signed in 2012, Manning had been slated to earn $19 million in 2015. Manning earned back $2 million with the Broncos' win over the New England Patriots in the AFC Championship, and earned an additional $2 million with the Broncos' Super Bowl 50 win.
 Tight end Owen Daniels, who was signed at the beginning of the free agency period in March, played the first ten years of his NFL career (2006–15) under the tutelage of head coach Gary Kubiak and tight ends coach Brian Pariani. Daniels was released on March 8, 2016, after only one season with the Broncos.

References

External links

 2015 Season page on Pro Football Reference
 2015 Denver Broncos season at ESPN

Denver
Denver Broncos seasons
Denver Broncos
AFC West championship seasons
American Football Conference championship seasons
Super Bowl champion seasons